Heltberg is a surname. Notable people with the surname include:

Bettina Heltberg (born 1942), Danish writer and actor, daughter of Grethe
Grethe Heltberg (1911–1996), Danish writer and poet
Hilde Heltberg (1959–2011), Norwegian singer, guitarist, and songwriter

See also
Hultberg